Akasa may refer to:

Philosophy
 Ākāśa, a concept in Indian cosmology
 Ākāśa (Jainism), space in the Jain conception of the cosmos

People and persons
 Akasa Singh, Indian singer
 Akassa tribe (also called Akasa) from Nigeria

Places
 , Hamakita Ward, Hamamatsu, Shizuoka Prefecture, Japan
 Akasa Linea, 486958 Arrokoth, Kuiper Belt, Solar System; the neck of Arrokoth

Groups and organizations
 Akasa (band), a British music band
 Akasa Air, Indian low-cost airline based in Mumbai

Other uses
 Udara akasa (U. akasa), a butterfly from India

See also 

 
 Acasa
 Akasha (disambiguation)
 Akasaka (disambiguation)